Deram Records was a subsidiary record label of Decca Records established in the United Kingdom in 1966. At the time, U.K. Decca was a different company from the Decca label in the United States, which was owned by MCA Inc. Deram recordings were  distributed in the U.S. through UK Decca's American branch known as London Records. Deram was active until 1979, then continued as a reissue label.

1966–1968
In the 1960s Decca recording engineers experimented with ways of improving stereo recordings. They created a technique they named "Decca Panoramic Sound." The term "Deramic" was created as abbreviation of this. The new concept "allowed for more space between instruments, rendering these sounds softer to the ear." Early stereo recordings of popular music usually were mixed with sounds to the hard left, centre, or hard right only. This was because of the technical limitations of the professional 4-track reel-to-reel recorders which were considered state of the art until 1967.

Decca initially conceived Deram Records as an outlet for Deramic Sound recordings of contemporary pop and rock music, however, not all of the early recordings on Deram used this technique. 'Deramic Sound' was intended to create recordings that had a more natural stereo spread. The basic difference was that, instead of overdubbing and mixing four individual (mono) tracks from a four-track recorder, the Decca recording engineers used a pair of four-track machines to layer multiple two-channel (stereo) recordings. This new concept, with additional tracks, permitted the engineer to place instruments more easily in any position within the stereo field.

To launch the 'Deramic Sound' concept Deram issued a series of six easy listening orchestral pop albums in October 1967.  The albums all included the word Night in the title, i.e. Strings in the Night, Brass in the Night, etc.  Artists in this series included Gordon Franks, Peter Knight, and Tony Osborne. The label was soon reinvented as a rival to early pre-punk 'indie' record companies like Island Records and moulded into a home for 'progressive' or 'psychedelic' artists. Among the first recordings in this series was the November 1967 album release Days of Future Passed by the Moody Blues, while Crocheted Doughnut Ring and Beverley Martyn were also signed to the label around this time.

Professional eight-track recorders began to appear in many British studios starting with Advision Studios and Trident Studios in early 1968. The eight-track machines were far more flexible than the dual four-track recorder setup. By 1969 Decca had obtained its own eight-track recorder. Since Decca engineers no longer had more tracks than other major studios the 'Deramic Sound' concept quickly became outdated and was dropped.

1969–1982
The roster later included British jazz and folk. Some of the more progressive jazz musicians of the late 1960s were released under the Deram imprint, including Mike Gibbs, John Surman, and Mike Westbrook. Deram albums bore a DML prefix for mono and an SML prefix for stereo releases. As with other UK Decca subsidiary labels, Deram's U.S. counterpart was distributed under London Records. Decca positioned it against Island Records, Harvest Records (started by EMI), and Vertigo Records (started by Philips Records), but it failed to compete. An 'extra' progressive series with SDL prefixes did not improve the situation.

From the start, Decca placed pop records next to progressive artists on Deram. Cat Stevens found early success there before moving to Island Records, and David Bowie's first album appeared on the label. Three of Deram's earliest hits, Procol Harum's "A Whiter Shade of Pale" and the Move's "Night of Fear" and "I Can Hear the Grass Grow", were produced outside the company by artists not directly signed to Deram. They were part of a deal with Straight Ahead Productions, who later moved their acts to EMI and had them released on the re-introduced Regal Zonophone imprint.

In 1969, Decca launched Nova, a progressive label that lasted less than a year. This caused further confusion as simultaneous releases on Deram Nova and Decca Nova appeared. Decca released Justin Hayward's Songwriter (1977) and Night Flight (1980) vinyl albums on Deram. In 1980, Sir Edward Lewis sold Decca to PolyGram, which put its new acquisition under the control of Roger Ames.
Even though the label name was briefly used in the early 1980s for records by Bananarama, the Mo-dettes, and Splodgenessabounds, Ames decided to focus on Decca (for classical music) and London Recordings (for pop music), with London run as his own 'semi-autonomous indie' from within the major. From this point Deram was used as a reissue imprint for other recordings in the Decca/London catalogue and was eventually sold to Universal/UMG as part of Decca Records (London went with Ames to WMG, who sold it to French indie Because Music in 2017)

Discography (singles)

1966

1967

1968

1969

1970

1971

1972

1973

1974

1975

1977

1979

1980

1981–1996

Notes

References

External links
 Deram Records from BSN Pubs
 A discography of American Deram singles
 A discography of Canadian Deram releases

Alternative rock record labels
British record labels
 
Jazz record labels
Record labels established in 1966
Record labels disestablished in 1979
Re-established companies
Progressive rock record labels
Rock record labels
London Records